The 2013–14 Oregon State Beavers men's basketball team represented Oregon State University in the 2013–14 NCAA Division I men's basketball season. Led by sixth year head coach Craig Robinson. The Beavers played their home games at Gill Coliseum in Corvallis, Oregon and were a member of the Pac-12 Conference.

2013 recruiting class

Roster

Schedule 

|-
!colspan=12 style="background:orange; color:#;"| Exhibition

|-
!colspan=12 style="background:orange; color:#;"| Non-conference regular season

|-
!colspan=12 style="background:orange;"| Pac-12 regular season

|-
!colspan=12 style="background:orange;"| Pac-12 tournament

|-
!colspan=12 style="background:orange;"| CBI

References

Oregon State Beavers men's basketball seasons
Oregon State
Oregon State
Oregon State
Oregon State